Union Sportive de Biskra,, known as US Biskra or simply USB for short, is an Algerian football club based in Biskra. The club was founded in 1934 and the club colours are green and black. Their home stadium, Complexe Sportif d'El Alia, has a capacity of 35,000 spectators. The club is currently playing in the Algerian Ligue Professionnelle 1.

History
Some of its famous players of the 1970s and early-1980s include: Majorie, Chaib Lakhal, Mohamed Jonas, Mirini, Bessaou, Bouzidi, Ben Brahim, and of course Doubba.

L'USB was stock in the third division for most of its history and played major roles but never made it up. The third division used to be called "Division d'Honneur". At that time the most important achievement was defeating the then, and even now, mighty ES Setif 2–1 in Algerian cup. That was a short lived happy time followed by a loss to  USM Bel-Abbès in the same competition by 4–1. All the citizens of Biskra still remember the year of Azzaba when l'US Biskra lost at home in one of the final games to Azzaba 3–1 and therefore missing the accession to the second division then known as "Division Regional".

L'US Biskra now is in second division and even played in Division one for one season two years ago. In may 2017, US Biskra returned to the Algerian Ligue Professionnelle 1 after 11 years of absence.

Honours

Domestic competitions
 Algerian Ligue Professionnelle 2
Champion (1): 2004–05

Players

Algerian teams are limited to two foreign players. The squad list includes only the principal nationality of each player;

Current squad
As of 2 February 2023.

Former players
For a list of current and former US Biskra player with a Wikipedia article, see :Category:US Biskra players

Personnel

Current technical staff

References

External links

 
Association football clubs established in 1934
Football clubs in Algeria
Us Biskra
Algerian Ligue 2 clubs
1934 establishments in Algeria
Sports clubs in Algeria
Algerian Ligue Professionnelle 1 clubs